The Crime-Free Multi-Housing (CFMH) program is a crime prevention program, which partners property owners, residents, and law-enforcement personnel in an effort to eliminate crime, drugs, and gangs on rental properties.

History 
The program began in Mesa, Arizona in the United States in 1992. Since then it has spread to other US cities and several other countries.

The International Crime Free Association says that the program has brought satisfied tenants, and increased demand for rental units, lower maintenance and repair costs, increased property values, and improved safety.

Program 
Three phases must be completed under police supervision:
 an eight-hour seminar presented by the local police department
 certification that the rental property has met the security requirements for the tenants' safety
 a tenant crime-prevention meeting is held

Landlords are allowed to advertise their full certification on their property.

See also 
 Crime prevention through environmental design

Notes

References

External links 
 Crime Free Housing Training, West Fargo, ND
 Crime-Free-Multi-Housing, City of Ottawa, Ontario, Canada
 Crime Free Multi-Housing Program, British Columbia, Canada
 Crime Free Multi-Housing, Tucson, AZ
 EPD Crime Free Multi-Housing Program, Evansville, IN

Criminology
Security engineering
Crime prevention